Raïssa Maritain (née Oumansoff) (September 12, 1883 in Rostov-on-Don – November 4, 1960 in Paris) was a French poet and philosopher. She was the wife of Jacques Maritain, with whom she worked and whose companion she was for more than half a century, at the center of a circle of French Catholic intellectuals. His memoir, Les Grandes Amitiés, chronicles this. This book won the French Renewal Prize. Jacques Maritain, Raïssa and her sister Vera (1886-1959) form what will be called "the three Maritains".

Biography 
She was born on September 12, 1883 (Julian date: August 31, 1883) in the Russian Empire, in Rostov-on-Don, to a Jewish family. Her parents were Ilya (Yuda) Oumansoff (Umantzov) (January 25, 1859 in Pavlohrad - February 21, 1912 in Paris) and Hissia (Gisya) Brozgol (December 29, 1859 in Rostov-on-Don - May 21, 1932 in France).

Her parents came from very devout and observant Hasidic Jewish families.  Her father ran a sewing workshop, while her mother performed all kinds of household chores. When Raisa was two years old, her family moved to Mariupol, by the Sea of Azov.

She was deeply shaped by the piety and traditions of her observant family, especially by the example of her maternal grandfather Solomon (Zalman) Brozgol (1830-March 11, 1896 in Rostov-on-Don).

Later, in Raïssa's poems, essays, and diary she reveal a very pure, mystical approach, the source of which she described: "My maternal grandfather was a Ḥasid, and my father's father was a great ascetic sage. This is my inheritance."

Her maternal grandmother was Gnessya (Nesya) Brozgol (née Rosenblum) (1832 - May 19, 1899 in Rostov-on-Don).

In Mariupol, her sister Véra was born in 1886. Very early on, Raïssa showed a great desire to learn.  At age 7, she was admitted to high school despite the very limited quotas for Jews.  She admired everything related to school and knowledge;  she was doing very well in her studies.

In 1893, when she was ten years old, her parents decided to emigrate.  They want to ensure the future of their two daughters, Raïssa and Vera, which seemed difficult to Russia because of anti-Semitic discrimination. Their father's initial plan was to go as far as New York, but a friend persuaded him to settle in Paris;  The family emigrated to France, where Raïssa continued her education in a communal school in the Passage de la Bonne Graine.  In two weeks, she learned French well enough to understand the lessons and be ranked second in the class.  Two years later, she changed schools and prepared to enter university.

Jacques Maritain 
She immigrated to France and studied at the Sorbonne, where she met the young Jacques Maritain, a graduate in philosophy who was preparing a degree in science, whom she married in 1904. “So we decided to put our trust in the stranger for a while longer; we were going to give credit to existence, as an experience to be had, in the hope that at our vehement appeal the meaning of life would be revealed, that new values would be revealed so clearly that they would lead to our total adherence, and deliver us from the nightmare of a sinister and useless world. That if this experiment did not succeed, the solution would be suicide; suicide before the years have gathered their dust, before our young strength is worn out. We wanted to die by free refusal if it was impossible to live according to the truth."In 1904, she spent her holidays in a village in Loiret with her family and Jacques Maritain. As hygiene standards are not respected at the inn where they are staying, Raïssa suffers from a sore throat. She was diagnosed with retropharyngeal phlegmon, a disease that caused health problems that she would experience until the end of her life and which prevented her from having a regular occupation.

Henri Bergson's courses at the Collège de France, which Maritain and Raïssa began to attend on the advice of their good friend Charles Péguy, helped them to get out of this despair by enabling them to sense the existence of objective truth and a " the very possibility of metaphysical work.

Conversion to Catholicism 
Some time after their engagement in 1904, they met Léon Bloy who became their great friend, and converted to Catholicism. Their baptism, as well as that of her sister Véra, took place on June 11, 1906, at the Saint-Jean church in Montmartre, with Bloy as godfather.

After her conversion, Raïssa felt called to have a contemplative life, which was then reserved for nuns. With the help of her husband Jacques and her sister Vera, she manages to find a balance between her prayer life and her place in the world.

Jacques and Raïssa Maritain choose Humbert Clérissac, Dominican, as their first spiritual director. After his death, another Dominican, Garrigou-Lagrange, became their spiritual father and their friend.

Raïssa and Jacques Maritain will forge a great friendship with Jean Bourgoint, a Cistercian who will go and treat lepers – they left a correspondence. Jean Bourgoint remained very affected by the death of Raïssa on November 4, 1960.

Publications 
Essays

 De mœurs divines, Librairie de l’Art catholique, Paris 1921.
 De la vie d’oraison, À l’Art catholique, Paris 1925.
 Le Prince de ce monde, Plon, Paris 1929.
 L’Ange de l’École, ou saint Thomas d’Aquin raconté aux enfants, Alsatia, Paris 1957.
 Marc Chagall, Éditions de la Maison française, New York 1943.
 Léon Bloy, Pilgrim of the Absolute, Pantheon Books, New York-London 1947.
 Les Grandes Amitiés, coll. « Livre de vie », Desclée de Brouwer, 1949.
 Liturgie et contemplation, Desclée de Brouwer, Paris 1959.
 Journal de Raïssa, Desclée de Brouwer, Paris 1962.

Poetry

 La Vie donnée, Labergerie, Paris 1935.
 Lettre de nuit, Desclée de Brouwer, Paris 1939.
 Portes de l’horizon, Monastère Regina Laudis, Bethlehem (Connecticut) 1952.
 Poèmes et essais, Desclée de Brouwer, Paris 1968.

Notes References
 Moore, Brenna. (2013).Sacred dread: Raïssa Maritain, the allure of suffering, and the French Catholic revival (1905-1944). Notre Dame, Ind: Univ. of Notre Dame Press.

References

1883 births
1960 deaths
Converts to Roman Catholicism from atheism or agnosticism
Converts to Roman Catholicism from Judaism
19th-century Jews from the Russian Empire
20th-century French philosophers
French Roman Catholics
Emigrants from the Russian Empire to France
Writers from Rostov-on-Don
20th-century French poets
University of Paris alumni
Jewish atheists